Hydrangea tarapotensis is a shrub or woody climber in the flowering plant family Hydrangeaceae. It is native to South America.

References

Hydrangea
Flora of Peru